The 2012–13 Tulsa Golden Hurricane men's basketball team represented the University of Tulsa during the 2012–13 NCAA Division I men's basketball season. The Golden Hurricane, led by first year head coach Danny Manning, played their home games at the Reynolds Center and were members of Conference USA. They finished the season 17–16, 8–8 in C-USA play to finish in sixth place. They advanced to the semifinals of the C-USA tournament where they lost to Memphis. They were invited to the 2013 College Basketball Invitational where they lost in the first round to Wright State.

Roster

Schedule

|-
!colspan=9| Exhibition

|-
!colspan=9| Regular season

|-
!colspan=9| 2013 Conference USA men's basketball tournament

|-
!colspan=9|2013 College Basketball Invitational

References

Tulsa Golden Hurricane men's basketball seasons
Tulsa
Tulsa
2012 in sports in Oklahoma
2013 in sports in Oklahoma